Podlokanj is a village in Serbia. It is situated in the Novi Kneževac municipality, in the North Banat District, Vojvodina province. The village has a Serb ethnic majority (97.23%) and its population numbering 217 people (2002 census).

Historical population

1961: 457
1971: 331
1981: 274
1991: 172

References
Slobodan Ćurčić, Broj stanovnika Vojvodine, Novi Sad, 1996.

See also
List of places in Serbia
List of cities, towns and villages in Vojvodina

Populated places in Serbian Banat
Populated places in North Banat District
Novi Kneževac